Sant'Antonio Abate is a commune (municipality) in the Metropolitan City of Naples in the Italian region Campania, located about 30 km southeast of Naples.

Sant'Antonio Abate borders the following municipalities: Angri, Gragnano, Lettere, Pompei, Santa Maria la Carità, Scafati.

References

Cities and towns in Campania